Aukusti Sihvola (7 March 1895 – 18 June 1947) was a Finnish wrestler and Olympic medalist. He was born in Sippola.

He received a silver medal in freestyle wrestling at the 1928 Summer Olympics in Amsterdam.

Sihvola died in Luumäki.

References

External links
 
 

1895 births
1947 deaths
People from Kouvola
People from Viipuri Province (Grand Duchy of Finland)
Finnish male sport wrestlers
Olympic wrestlers of Finland
Wrestlers at the 1928 Summer Olympics
Olympic silver medalists for Finland
Olympic medalists in wrestling
Medalists at the 1928 Summer Olympics
Sportspeople from Kymenlaakso
19th-century Finnish people
20th-century Finnish people